Lianny Boudjadi, born 14 June 1988 in Paris is a French and Algerian DJ and record producer.

Biography 

Born in the Paris suburbs, he definitely chose his own way in 2003 at the age of 14 years old : "Electronic music"

In 2017 he produce "Across The Water" feat Laenz and will be #1 radio charts in Russia and Ukraine. French "solo artist" most playlisted on eastern countries radio, a second single will follow "Tired Bones" and will be Number one in 15 eastern countries. That success will take him to the stage of the biggest concert of the year in Moscou "Europa Plus Live" in front of 200 000 peoples in July 2019.

2020 was an incredible year for L.B.ONE. During the quarantine he decide to release a cover song "My Mother Told Me" from the famous serie "Vikings". Shared and supported by the actors/heroes of the serie themselves, the track will reached the iTunes TOP 100 of 40 countries, will have more than 30M views on TikTok and will be on Billboard Dance Charts during 9weeks.

Discography

Singles 
2011
 Pop corn [Arrested Records]

2012
 Psyko [Lukes club Records]
 Love U More [Pizunda Recordings]
 Love Avenue [R-inc studio Records]
 Back to Monarchy [Mynt Records]
 Tsunami (feat. Datamotion) [Arrested Records]
 Bad Habit [Arrested Records]
 Night Dreaming (feat. Fey B) [Dj Center Records]

2013
 Over the Drop (feat. Datamotion) [Entraxx Records]
 To the Stars (feat. Scarlett Quinn) [Mynt Records]
 Freakin' Night [Pop Rox Muzik]
 OMG [Pop Rox Muzik]
 Ibiza Morning [Mynt Records]
 Love Control [Mynt Records]

2014
 Equinox [Lukes club Records]
 Things We Do For Love [Free Download]
 Can Get You [Lukes club Records]

 2015
 Jam For Me [Space Party]
 Insane [Space Party]
 3.0 (feat. Datamotion) [Space Party]

 2016
 Slow Down (feat. Amy Kirkpatrick) [Space Party]
 Slow Down (Hip Hop Version) (feat. Amy Kirkpatrick & Ellis Bailey) [Space Party]
 Summer Vibe (feat. Simon Erics) [Space Party]
 Across The Water (feat. Laenz) [Happy Music]

 2017
 Tired Bones (feat. Laenz) [Happy Music]

 2018
 Trust Me (feat. Laenz) [Happy Music]
 We Own This (feat. Filatov & Karas) [Happy Music]
 Rue des Abbesses [Happy Music]

 2019
 French Lover (feat. Joss Bari) [Happy Music]
 Chilly [Happy Music]

 2020
 Origin (Pt. I) [Happy Music]
 Origin (Pt. II) [Happy Music]
 She's On Your Phone [Happy Music]
 Anybody Else But You [Happy Music]
 My Mother Told Me (feat. Datamotion & Perly I Lotry) [Happy Music]
 Breakdown [Happy Music]
 Barbès [RUN DBN]
 2021 [Bad Boys Make Noise]

 2021
 Each Must Die Someday (feat. Datamotion & Perly I Lotry) [Happy Music]
 Wellerman (feat. Datamotion & Perly I Lotry) [Happy Music]

 2022
 Careless Whisper (feat. Ebisu & Datamotion) [Happy Music]
 Addictive [Happy Music]
 Tapion (feat. Datamotion) [Bad Boys Make Noise]

Albums 
2014
L.B. One - 1988 (The Album) [Space Party]
 Intro 
 Blood, Toils, Tears & Sweat (Album Version) 
 Love Control 
 Question For You (Edit Mix) 
 Jam For Me (feat. Bash)
 I'm Addicted (feat. Olivia) 
 Insane (Extented Mix) 
 Ibiza Morning 
 Odeon Sax 
 Love Avenue
 Can Get You
 There Will Be No More (feat. Ms King)

2016
L.B. One - Middle Of Nowhere (EP) [Mynt Records / Space Party]
 Middle Of Nowhere (Intro) 
 Slow Down ft Amy Kirkpatrick 
 People Say ft Viktoria WindLord 
 Make Me High 
 Summer Vibe ft Simon Erics
 Slow Down (Hip Hop Version) ft Amy Kirkpatrick & Ellis Bailey

References 

1988 births
Club DJs
French house musicians
French DJs
Musicians from Paris
French record producers
Living people
Electronic dance music DJs